Kōsuke, Kosuke or Kousuke (written: 康介, 康裕, 康祐, 浩介, 浩輔, 浩祐, 公介, 公輔, 公祐, 公亮, 幸介, 幸佑, 孝介, 孝亮, 孝輔, 孝助, 康介, 宏介, 紘介, 広祐, 光祐, 光佑, 光将, 耕助, 耕輔, 耕佑, 興輔, 昂輔, 晃佑, 亘右, 航輔,耕輔, 功佑 or こうすけ in hiragana) is a masculine Japanese given name. Notable people with the name include:

, Japanese motorcycle racer
, Bulgarian sumo wrestler
, Japanese singer
, Japanese rugby union player
, Japanese manga artist
, Japanese baseball player
, pen-name of Gomi Yasusuke, Japanese writer
, Japanese swimmer
, Japanese footballer
, Japanese politician
, Japanese general
, Japanese footballer
, Japanese politician
, Japanese baseball player
, Japanese footballer
, Japanese footballer
, Japanese footballer
, Japanese swimmer
, Japanese footballer
, Japanese theologian
, Japanese actor and singer
, Japanese manga artist
, Japanese racing driver
, Japanese curler
, Japanese footballer
, Japanese footballer
, Japanese baseball player
, Japanese voice actor
, Japanese footballer
, Japanese footballer
, Japanese footballer
, Japanese DJ and composer
, Japanese footballer
, Japanese footballer
, Japanese footballer
, Japanese footballer
, Japanese journalist
, Japanese historian
, Japanese footballer
, Japanese basketball player
, Japanese shogi player
, Japanese voice actor
, Japanese footballer
, Japanese footballer
, Japanese composer
, Japanese footballer
, Japanese footballer
, Japanese singer and actor
, Japanese footballer

Fictional characters
, a fictional Japanese detective created by Seishi Yokomizo
Kosuke Shirai, a character from the manga series Urusei Yatsura

Japanese masculine given names